Innocent Himbaza (born 11 July 1965) is a Rwandan born Lutheran pastor, hebraist, private lecturer at the University of Fribourg (Switzerland) for the exegesis of Biblical theology of the Old Testament.

Early life and studies 
He was born in a small Rwandan village Gahini in Hutu family, to Isaïe Mbonigaba and Jeanne (née Mukagahigi). Between 1982 and 1984 was a primary school teacher in Gahini. In 1988 he graduated as a theologian in Rwanda and served two years like chaplain in Gikongoro. From 1990 was a secondary school teacher in Fribourg. During this time, he also pursued higher education at the university and since 1998 been a member of the University of Fribourg.

Teaching and research 
Innocent Himbaza is doctor of Theology and Humanities. Eight years was educational assistant. From 1998 he is the Lutheran pastor of the University of Fribourg. From 1997 to 2004 he was a member of the board in the Groupes Bibliques Universitaires. One of his works The Bible on the Question of Homosexuality. He is one of the editors of the German Bible Society and participant in the program Biblia Hebraica Quinta. In 2020 published the Leviticus in his editing.

Personal life 
Himbaza still lives in Switzerland with his family. His wife, Swiss-born Liliane Mouron. Had two daughters: Sarah and Esther.

Selected works 

 Translated into English by Benedict M. Guevin as The Bible on the Question of Homosexuality, 2012.

 Biblia Hebraica Quinta – Leviticus. Deutsche Bibelgesellschaft (2020)

References

1965 births
Living people
Christian Hebraists
20th-century Lutheran clergy
Rwandan Christian clergy
People from Kayonza District
People from Eastern Province, Rwanda
Academic staff of the University of Fribourg